The Nord Wave is a 49-key polyphonic synthesiser developed by Clavia. It integrates the playback and manipulation of samples into a virtual analog and FM synth engine, which is a rare combination on keyboard synthesizers.

Sound Generation

The Wave has two oscillators, each with six different sound banks. Five of these banks are common to both; these are the three analog waveforms provided (sawtooth, triangular and square), as well as noise generation and FM synthesis (with many different algorithms provided). Oscillator One's unique bank is a wavetable bank, with a sample-playback bank being unique to Oscillator Two (the latter of which is full of Mellotron tapesets, amongst other things).

Performance control

There is an extensive, comprehensive user interface on this keyboard, with plenty of dials and switches at one's fingertips. Shown below is a list of these features.

 Polyphony Selection (Poly/Mono/Legato) with Glide control.
 Routable Vibrato.
 Octave Shifter, Pitch Bend and Modulation Wheel.
 Live Patches (Two Slots).
 Modulation Envelope.
 Two routable LFO's (with five waveforms).
 Oscillator Mixer, Osc 2 Detune and Pitch Shift.
 Variable keyboard tracking.
 Amplitude and Filter Envelopes (both with ADSR configuration).
 Variable (Cut-off and Resonance) filter (with six types of filter).
 Two-band EQ.
 Four effects engines (Chorus, Drive, Reverb and Delay).

References

Further reading

External links
 http://www.nordkeyboards.com/main.asp?tm=Products&clpm=Nord_Wave

Clavia synthesizers